The China-ASEAN International Youth Football Tournament is an international youth football tournament held annually in Guangxi, China.

Winners

Performances by countries

References

Sport in Guangxi